Pink BH is a Bosnian cable television channel based in Sarajevo. It was established on 3 September 2018 as Pink Media BH when Pink Media Group sold its terrestrial commercial channels Pink BH (now Nova BH) and Pink M (now Nova M) (now Nova M) to The United Group.

Programming
Pink BH channel lineup consists of programmes from Pink's terrestrial channel Pink TV intended for linear broadcasting or re-broadcasting on the Bosnian market. By concept and name, a similar tv channel called Pink M is intended for public in neighboring Montenegro.

News
 Minut 2 - daily news bulletin, every full hour - duration 2 minutes with an overview of the most important news for and from Bosnia and Herzegovina.

Entertainment
 Zadruga - reality TV show 
 Pinkove Zvezdice - music singing contest for kids
 Pinkove Zvezde - music singing contest for adults
 Bravo Show - music show
 Ami G Show - talk show hosted by Ognjen Amidžić
 Premijera - tv magazine about celebrities 
 Ekskluzivno - tv magazine about celebrities 
  - tv magazine about celebrities 
 Akademija debelih - reality show
 Kuvanje i muvanje - cooking show
 Prvi kuvar Srbije - reality cooking show
 Kuća od srca - TV show of humanitarian character
 Izvedi me - Take Me Out

Series, Telenovelas
September 2018:

References

External links

Television stations in Bosnia and Herzegovina
Television channels and stations established in 2018